State Route 211 (SR 211) is a state highway in the U.S. state of California that connects Ferndale with U.S. 101 in Humboldt County. The highway was originally designed to be the northernmost segment of State Route 1, but after construction of the Coast Highway through the Lost Coast region was abandoned, the route to Ferndale was renumbered to SR 211.

Route description

Currently, Route 211 runs about 5 miles (8 km) from roughly the intersection of Main Street and Ocean Avenue in Ferndale north to US 101 in Fernbridge, crossing over the bridge of the same name over the Eel River. However, the highway was meant to extend south through the Lost Coast region to California State Route 1 near Rockport. This remaining 103 mi (166 km) of Highway 211 is unlikely ever to be constructed because of the steep and unstable highlands of the Lost Coast. The traversable route through Humboldt and Mendocino Counties is Chemise Mountain Road, Wilder Ridge Road, and Mattole Road, but these remain small mountain roads.

SR 211 is part of the California Freeway and Expressway System, but is not part of the National Highway System, a network of highways that are considered essential to the country's economy, defense, and mobility by the Federal Highway Administration.

History
This route was originally signed as the northernmost segment of California State Route 1, but was renumbered as SR 211 in 1984 after construction through the Lost Coast was abandoned; the portion of Highway 1 north of Rockport was then re-routed along the former State Route 208 to terminate with US 101 in Leggett.

Major intersections

See also

References

External links

California Highways: SR 211
California @ AARoads.com - State Route 211
Caltrans: Route 211 highway conditions

211
State Route 211
Ferndale, California